Edward L. Jackson (December 27, 1873 – November 18, 1954) was an American attorney, judge and politician, elected the 32nd governor of the U.S. state of Indiana from January 12, 1925, to January 14, 1929. He had also been elected as Secretary of State of Indiana.

Jackson associated with Ku Klux Klan leaders, and became involved in several political scandals. He was accused of favoring the Klan's agenda while in office. In 1927 he was investigated and tried on bribery charges related to having tried to bribe the previous governor, but was not convicted as the statute of limitations had expired. After finishing his term in office, he left in disgrace and never ran again for public office.

Early life and education
Edward Jackson was born on December 27, 1873, in Howard County, Indiana, the son of Presley and Mary Howell Jackson. His family were members of the Disciples of Christ church. His father was a mill worker. As a boy, Edward delivered newspapers and attended public schools.

After completing school he took a job in a factory producing stakes.

Marriage and family
After beginning his career as a lawyer, Jackson married Rosa Wilkinson on February 20, 1897. The couple had two daughters, Helen and Gertrude. Rosa died in October 1919 during the influenza epidemic.

Jackson remarried about a year later, on November 23, 1920, to Lydia Beaty Pierce. The couple adopted an infant son, whom they named Edward Jackson Jr.

Law career
Jackson began reading the law as a legal apprentice after he finished school. He passed the bar and opened a law office in Kennard in 1893. His business was not very successful at first, and he worked in a brickyard to earn a steady income, especially to support his family.

By 1898, his law office had become a full-time position. He worked on many cases for the Henry County prosecutor's office.

Political career
In 1901, Jackson ran successfully for the prosecutor's position and served until 1906. He was elected as a county circuit court judge in 1907 and remained on the court until 1914, during which time he gained a strong political base of support.

His popularity in the Republican Party helped in winning the nomination to run for Indiana Secretary of State in 1916, which he won. His time in office was brief however, as he resigned shortly after World War I broke out and enlisted in the United States Army. He was commissioned as a captain in November 1917 and stationed in Toledo, Ohio. He was soon moved to Battle Creek, Michigan, and then Lafayette, Indiana, where he was promoted to major and made commandant of a training facility. He continued to train new recruits until he was discharged from the army in February 1919.

Ku Klux Klan
After leaving the military, Jackson opened a new law office in Lafayette, Indiana.  In 1920 Governor of Indiana James P. Goodrich appointed Jackson as Secretary of State after the incumbent William Roach died in January 1920.

In 1922, he campaigned for the office and was elected. Jackson was interested in running for higher office, and began to seek out supporters for his coming bid for the governorship. There is no evidence that Jackson ever was a member of the KKK. However, he was approached by D. C. Stephenson, Grand Dragon of the Indiana Klan, who discussed issues of interest to the Klan, such as eliminating the influence of Catholics, Jews and 'coloreds'.

Although the full extent of the Klan's power was unknown at that time, it claimed that its members occupied more than half the seats in the Indiana General Assembly, and a large percentage of the local offices in Indiana. Historians estimate that nearly a third of the men in the state belonged to the Klan. At the time, the public generally perceived the Klan members as defenders of justice, morality, and Americanism. The organization's reputation and influence made Jackson decide to accept their support.  Many Hoosiers feared that the Klan would control the state legislature in 1924. However, historian James Madison points out that, "The Klan's effort ended in nearly total failure."

Jackson soon found his deal with Klan leaders to be troublesome, as the Klan began demanding specific actions from him. He granted the Klan a state charter, to the disgust of Republican Governor Warren T. McCray who was one of the only state officials to try to battle them. Jackson worked to persuade McCray to support the Klan's agenda, and in 1923, Jackson offered McCray a $10,000 bribe on behalf of Stephenson if he would fill several public offices with Klan members. McCray, a millionaire, declined the bribe and was offended at the offer. The dealing was behind the scenes and not made public.

Governor
The Klan's support of Jackson did not seem to make any significant impact at the polls, as he campaigned against Democratic candidate Carleton B. McCulloch. Republican party leaders did not want Jackson to take an open endorsement from the Klan for fear it would hurt some parts of the ticket. To remedy the situation, Jackson gave a speech guaranteeing "full civil and religious liberty for Jews, Catholics, and blacks." Although his statement was a kind of lip service to tolerance, the leadership of the Klan refrained from endorsing his candidacy.

Jackson won the election by nearly 100,000 votes, despite having lost most of the normally Republican African-American vote to McCulloch. He was inaugurated on January 12, 1925. He stressed the need to run the government economically. His administration oversaw the payoff of the state's US$3.5 million debt and a significant reduction in taxes. He also increased attention on the Department of Conservation. The Indiana Dunes State Park and the George Rogers Clark Memorial were established with his support.

Prohibition
As governor, Jackson supported stronger prohibition. The Wright Bone Dry Law was passed by the General Assembly to increase penalties and jail time for prohibition violators. It closed some loopholes in the prohibition laws, such as banning the sale of whiskey for medicinal purposes. Jackson was soon caught up in a small scandal when his wife became sick in 1925. Jackson personally procured some medicinal whiskey, and she soon recovered from her sickness. Word soon got out about his actions, but he asked the public for forgiveness. He assured constituents that their prayers and not the whiskey had cured his wife.

Klan politics

In the autumn of 1925, United States Senator Samuel M. Ralston died in office, and Jackson needed to appoint his replacement. He chose Arthur Raymond Robinson at the advice of Stephenson. Republican leaders were upset with Jackson over the choice, as they had favored the appointment of former senator Albert J. Beveridge. Opponents began to charge that the Klan was in control of the governor's office.

The following year Indiana Attorney General Arthur L. Gilliom arrested Edward Shumaker, the leader of the Indiana Anti-Saloon League. He charged Shumaker with contempt of court because of newsletters he was circulating that attacked the Indiana Supreme Court; he accused them of lax enforcement of prohibition laws. He was convicted and sentenced to serve time on the Indiana work farm. As Shumaker was the leader of a key Republican support group, Jackson pardoned him. Gilliom took the pardon to court and had the pardon overturned by the Supreme Court. Shumaker was required to serve his term.

High-profile problems continued for Jackson. In 1925, Stephenson had been arrested and tried for the rape and murder of Madge Oberholtzer. He was convicted and sentenced to life in prison. He demanded that Jackson pardon him, but the governor refused. Angered, Stephenson started talking to reporters in 1927 from the Indianapolis Times and provided names of people who had been paid bribes by the Klan and taken part in other illegal activity. He had kept a "black box" of records that provided evidence for many of his accusations. He exposed Jackson's attempt to bribe McCray with $10,000 years earlier.

Numerous religious and civic groups in the state demanded for Jackson to resign. His case, like many other Klan bribery cases, was brought to court. His trial ended in a hung jury, and the statute of limitations precluded any possible conviction. Despite the final result of the trial, Jackson was widely criticized across the state; he left office disgraced and ended his political career. The Indiana Klan's power collapsed and the scandals contributed to the decline of Klan membership nationally.

State parks
Numerous state parks were established during Jackson's term as governor: Brown County State Park, Indiana Dunes State Park in Porter County, Pokagon State Park in Steuben County, and Spring Mill State Park in Lawrence County (see List of Indiana state parks for exact years of park's establishment).

Later life
Jackson resumed his law practice, opening an office in Indianapolis. He lived there until 1937. That year he moved to a large farm he purchased near Orleans, where he raised cattle and maintained an apple orchard. He was active in several local clubs. In 1948, he suffered a massive stroke that left him bedridden for the rest of his life. He died in his home on November 18, 1954, and was buried in the Green Hill Cemetery of Orleans.

See also

Indiana Klan
List of governors of Indiana

References

Bibliography

Further reading

External links
Ed Jackson biography
Jackson Biography, Indiana County History  
Edward Jackson Papers, Indiana State Library
National Governors Association
 

1873 births
1954 deaths
Republican Party governors of Indiana
American prosecutors
American temperance activists
Indiana lawyers
Indiana state court judges
American Ku Klux Klan members
Secretaries of State of Indiana
United States Army personnel of World War I
United States Army officers
Indiana politicians convicted of crimes
20th-century American politicians